In fluid dynamics, an edge wave is a surface gravity wave fixed by refraction against a rigid boundary, often a shoaling beach.  Progressive edge waves travel along this boundary, varying sinusoidally along it and diminishing exponentially in the offshore direction.

References

Further reading 
 

Oceanography
Water waves